= Maryland Terrapins basketball =

Maryland Terrapins basketball may refer to:

- Maryland Terrapins men's basketball
- Maryland Terrapins women's basketball
